Escape from Arcturus is a 1981 video game published by Synergistic Software.

Gameplay
Escape from Arcturus is a game in which the player can either try to survive as long as possible while defending against unstoppable hostile alien bases, or evacuate inhabitants from the planet while aliens attack.

Reception
Bob Boyd reviewed the game for Computer Gaming World, and stated that "The high score for each mode is saved on disk which is a nice feature. The graphics are good in the "Fortress" mode and outstanding in the "Escape" mode. As current arcade games go, however, Escape from Arcturus tends to be a little simplistic."

References

External links
Review in Creative Computing

1981 video games
Apple II games
Apple II-only games
Shoot 'em ups
Synergistic Software games
Video games developed in the United States
Video games set in outer space